Indy Barends (born 15 January 1972 in Bogor, West Java) is an Indonesian radio personality, television host, presenter, humorist and actress. She rose to popularity after hosting the talk show Ceriwis on Trans TV. replacing Meuthia Kasim. She is one of the four jury members in Indonesian Idol 3, replacing Meuthia Kasim.

References

External links
 
 

1972 births
Indonesian Christians
Indonesian film actresses
Indonesian Idol
Indonesian people of Chinese descent
Indonesian television presenters
Living people
People from Bogor
Actresses from West Java
Indonesian women television presenters